Another Beginning is an album by pianist Les McCann recorded in 1974 and released on the Atlantic label.

Reception

Allmusic gives the album 2 stars.

Track listing 
All compositions by Les McCann except as indicated
 "Maybe You'll Come Back" – 3:58
 "The Song of Love" – 3:14
 "When It's Over" (J. Mayer, B. Barnes, J. Lynn) – 10:28
 "Somebody's Been Lying 'bout Me" – 3:32
 "Go On and Cry" – 5:23
 "My Soul Lies Deep" (Les McCann, Reverend B.) – 5:19
 "The Morning Song" – 3:38
 "Someday We'll Meet Again" – 6:58

Personnel 
Les McCann – piano, electric piano, synthesizer, clavinet, vocals, arranger
Jon Faddis, Danny Moore, Joe Wilder – trumpet, flugelhorn
Garnett Brown, Kiane Zawadi – trombone
Bill Slapin – clarinet, saxophone
Seldon Powell, Harold Vick, Frank Wess – saxophone
Roy Gaines (tracks 1 & 2), Miroslaw Kudykowski (tracks 3–7) – guitar
Chuck Rainey (tracks 1 & 2), Jimmy Rowser (tracks 3–7) – electric bass
Harold Davis (tracks 3–7), Paul Humphrey (tracks 1 & 2) – drums
Buck Clarke – percussion
William Eaton – arranger
Sally Stevens, Marti McCall, Bob Esty, Jim Gilstrap, Carmen Bryant, Vennette Gloud, Sandy Merrill Smolen, Kathy Collier, Morgan Ames, Cissy Houston, Deidre Tuck, Rennelle Stafford, Norma Holmes, Tamiko Loving, Laurence Moore – background vocals
David Nadien, Emanuel Green, Paul Gershman, Selwart Clarke, Joe Malin, Matthew Raimondi, Sanford Allen, Harry Lookofsky, Max Ellen, Harry Cykman – violin
Al Brown, Julien Barber – violas
Kermit Moore, George Ricci – cello
Herb Bushler – bass

Uses in other media 

"Go On And Cry" was sampled in the track "Flawless" from the Living Legends album, "Almost Famous". It was also sampled in "Runnin Wit No Breaks" by Warren G.

References 

Les McCann albums
1974 albums
Atlantic Records albums
Albums produced by Joel Dorn